National Route 195 is a national highway of Japan connecting Kōchi, Kōchi and Tokushima, Tokushima, with a total length of 198.2 km (120.95 mi).

References

National highways in Japan
Roads in Kōchi Prefecture
Roads in Tokushima Prefecture